The International School of Brussels (ISB) is an English-language international school with grades spanning from pre-school to high school. Its  campus lies in the Brussels commune of Watermael-Boitsfort.

History

The International School of Brussels opened in October 1951 as the American School of Brussels with four teachers and twenty-seven students between the ages of 5 and 11. It was first established to accommodate U.S. Department of Defense military personnel and their families living in Brussels. It was located in the Brussels commune of Woluwe-Saint-Pierre.

By the end of the 1953 term, the school was home to about 100 students and had moved to its current location at the Château des Fougères, in the Brussels commune of Watermael-Boitsfort. It changed its name from the American School of Brussels to the International School of Brussels.

In 1966, a new High School was opened, which however later became the Middle School building. In 1967, the currently used Elementary School was opened.

In its early years, the entire school was housed in the old Château des Fougères. ISB became an International Baccalaureate school on 1 January 1977 making it the 50th IB school worldwide. Additionally, the first International Festival was hosted in 1977, a festival which celebrates different cultures in the school.

In February 2006, the school board opted to begin fundraising because it determined that the tuition charged to its students was insufficient for its needs.

Buildings and campus
ISB is located on a  wooded campus. Green is the predominant colour on campus. Surrounding the school is a forest, with entries to the Brussels region's forest trails across the campus.

The 19th century building called the "Château" is the school's administration building. Designed with pillars, the building houses a reception area that hosts parents of students. The remaining buildings include the Early Childhood Centre (ECC), the Elementary School (ES), the Middle School (MS) and the High School (HS), the Annex, the theatre, the International Community Centre (ICC) and various sports facilities. ref></ref>

Academic buildings 
Most classes at ISB are housed in one of four main buildings.

 Early Childhood Centre (ECC): students aged 2½–8
 Elementary School (ES): students aged 8–12
 Middle School (MS): students aged 12–15
 High School (HS): students aged 15–19

Additional buildings 
 The Metairie hosts music programs.
 The International Community Centre, more commonly known as the ICC holds additional facilities and rooms.

Academics

The ISB offers the four core courses of the IB curriculum – Language Arts, Mathematics, Social Studies, and Science. In addition, ISB students take either French, English Language Development, or Study Skills. High School Students at ISB are offered either the International Baccalaureate or a combination of International Baccalaureate certificate courses and ISB courses both of which routes lead to a US High School Diploma accredited by the Middle States Association of Colleges and Schools. The most recent reaccreditation occurred in 2019. The school itself offers two tiers of diplomas. Unique among many international schools, ISB also offers a Special Education Diploma. ISB also offers courses in a varied selection of other languages. A total of 45 IB courses are offered.

Demographics
As of 2022, it had 1,350 students ranging in age from 3-18. The students originate from 70 countries.

Tuition and Finance
The tuition for students ranges from €18,310 to €39,515 depending mainly on age.

 Preschool: 18,310 Euro
 Pre–Kindergarten: 20,285 Euro
 Kindergarten: 30,605 Euro
 Grades 1 & 2: 32,960 Euro
 Grades 3–6: 33,560 Euro
 Grades 7–9: 36,221 Euro
 Grades 10–12 (13): 39,515 Euro

Intensive Learning Support (ILS) is an extra 20,090 euros on top of the grade level fee. Revenue in 2018-2019 school year, the school's revenue was 50,210,656 euros and their expenses being 50,735,742 euros.

Athletics
The ISB hosts a large quantity of sports programs, such as baseball, basketball, cross country, golf, lacrosse, swimming, American football, football, volleyball, field hockey, tennis, softball, and track & field. The ISB is one of the few international schools in the world which also offers American football as a sport.

References
“Private PreK-12 School in Belgium: International School of Brussels.” Private PreK-12 School in Belgium | International School of Brussels, www.isb.be/.
“Preparing Students for the Future of 70 years” https://www.isb.be/

Notes

External links

 ISB website

Buildings and structures completed in the 19th century
International schools in Brussels
Educational institutions established in 1951
International Baccalaureate schools in Belgium
1951 establishments in Belgium
Secondary schools in Brussels